Story of the Sword and the Sabre is a four-part Hong Kong film released in 1963 and 1965. The film was adapted from Louis Cha's novel The Heaven Sword and Dragon Saber. The first two parts were directed by Cheung Ying and Choi Cheung while the next two parts were directed by Yeung Kung-leung.

Cast
 Cheung Ying as Zhang Cuishan
 Pak Yin as Yan So-So
 Ka-Sing Lam as Zhang Wuji
 Leung Ka-bo as young Zhang Wuji
 Ho-Kau Chan as Zhao Min
 Connie Chan as Zhou Zhiruo
 Lee Hung as Xiaozhao
 Shih Kien as Xie Xun
 Yeung Sai
 Gao Luquan
 Sai Gwa-Pau
 Fung King-man
 Lee Pang-fei
 Cheung Sang
 Wong Hon
 Szema Wah Lung
 Yuen Siu-tien
 Lai Man
 Wan Leng-kwong
 Chow Kat
 Bak Man-biu
 Tam Tin
 Kwan Ching-leung
 Hoh Wan
 Lam Liu-ngok
 Ho Pik-kin
 Woo Ping
 Ding Yue
 Lam Siu
 Yuen Lap-cheung
 Au Ngok
 Tang Cheung
 Leung Suk-hing
 Ng Yan-chi
 Liu Chia-liang
 Chu Yau-ko
 Tong Kai
 Heung Hoi

External links
 
 
 
 

1963 films
1965 films
1960s Cantonese-language films
Films based on works by Jin Yong
Films released in separate parts
Hong Kong martial arts films
Works based on The Heaven Sword and Dragon Saber
Wuxia films
Films set in the Yuan dynasty
Films about rebels
Films set on islands